Solomon Islands competed at the 2022 Commonwealth Games in Birmingham, England between 28 July and 8 August 2022. It was the team's tenth appearance at the Games.

Competitors
The following is the list of number of competitors participating at the Games per sport/discipline.

Athletics

Men
Track and road events

Women
Track and road events

Beach volleyball

As of 26 April 2022, Solomon Islands qualified for the women's tournament. The intended Oceania qualifier was abandoned, so the quota allocation was determined by their position among other nations from Oceania in the women's FIVB Beach Volleyball World Rankings (for performances between 16 April 2018 and 31 March 2022).

Women's tournament
Group C

Boxing

Men

Judo

Men

Swimming

Men

Women

Table tennis

Singles

Doubles

Triathlon

Individual

Weightlifting

One weightlifter qualified through their position in the IWF Commonwealth Ranking List (as of 9 March 2022).

References

External links
NOCSI Facebook site

Nations at the 2022 Commonwealth Games
Solomon Islands at the Commonwealth Games
2022 in Solomon Islands sport